Baron Mostyn, of Mostyn in the County of Flint, is a title in the Peerage of the United Kingdom. It was created in 1831 for Sir Edward Lloyd, 2nd Baronet, who had earlier represented Flint Boroughs and Beaumaris in the House of Commons. His son, the second Baron, sat as a Member of Parliament for Flintshire and Lichfield and served as Lord Lieutenant of Merionethshire.

In 1831 Lord Mostyn assumed by Royal licence the additional surname of Mostyn. His eldest son and heir the Hon. Thomas Lloyd-Mostyn, who also represented Flintshire in Parliament, predeceased his father. Lord Mostyn was therefore succeeded by his grandson, the third Baron (the son of Hon. Thomas Lloyd-Mostyn). The 6th Baron died on 22 March 2011 and was succeeded by his only son.

The Baronetcy, of Pengwerra in the County of Flint, was created in the Baronetage of Great Britain in 1778 for Edward Lloyd, with remainder to his nephews. He was succeeded according to the special remainder by his eldest nephew, the aforementioned second Baronet, who was elevated to the peerage in 1831.

The family seat is Mostyn Hall, near Mostyn, Flintshire.

Lloyd Baronets, of Pengwerra (1778)
Sir Edward Pryce Lloyd, 1st Baronet (c. 1710–1795)
Sir Edward Pryce Lloyd, 2nd Baronet (1768–1854) (created Baron Mostyn in 1831)

Barons Mostyn (1831)
Edward Pryce Lloyd, 1st Baron Mostyn (1768–1854)
Edward Mostyn Lloyd-Mostyn, 2nd Baron Mostyn (1795–1884)
Hon. Thomas Edward Lloyd-Mostyn (1830–1861)
Llewelyn Nevill Vaughan Lloyd-Mostyn, 3rd Baron Mostyn (1856–1929)
Edward Llewellyn Roger Lloyd-Mostyn, 4th Baron Mostyn (1885–1965)
Roger Edward Lloyd Lloyd-Mostyn, 5th Baron Mostyn (1920–2000)
Llewellyn Roger Lloyd Lloyd-Mostyn, 6th Baron Mostyn (1948–2011)
Gregory 'Greg' Philip Roger Mostyn, 7th Baron Mostyn (b. 1984)

The heir presumptive is the present holder's third cousin twice removed, Roger Hugh Lloyd-Mostyn (born 1941), great-great-grandson of the 2nd Baron. 
The heir presumptive's heir is his eldest son, Christopher Edward Lloyd-Mostyn (b. 1968)
The heir presumptive's heir's heir is his son Alexander James Lloyd-Mostyn (b. 2000)

See also
Mostyn Baronets

Notes

References 

Baronies in the Peerage of the United Kingdom
1778 establishments in Great Britain
1831 establishments in the United Kingdom
Noble titles created in 1831
Noble titles created for UK MPs